The Siliștea is a right tributary of the river Țibrin in Romania. It passes through the artificial Lake Domneasca and flows into the Danube near Seimeni.

References

Rivers of Romania
Rivers of Constanța County